Johnny Ibrahim is a Lebanese diplomat currently serving as Lebanon ambassador to Argentina. Johnny was posted to the Holy See in 2017 but was rejected by Pope Francis. The media initially reported that the rejection of Ibrahim was due to the leaking to the media, the posting of Ibrahim to the Vatican before his official acceptance. But later a Lebanese newspaper Libnanews quoting Italian daily Il Messaggero wrote that the rejection was due to his alleged ties to freemasons, a group the Pope had been critical of. On 24 October 2017 Libnanews reported that Ibrahim had admitted being close to Masonic lodges many years ago but had now distanced himself from the group.

References 

Lebanese diplomats
Year of birth missing (living people)
Living people